Ciqikou  is a station on Line 1 of Chongqing Rail Transit in Shapingba District, Chongqing Municipality, China. It opened in 2012.Line 27, which is currently under construction, will also serve the station in future.

Station structure

References

Chongqing Rail Transit stations
Railway stations in China opened in 2012